Fritz Thiering (1892–1960) was an Australian rugby league footballer who played in the 1910s and 1920s.

Playing career
Of German descent, Fritz debuted for the Glebe rugby league club in 1911 at the age of 21. 

He played for Glebe for four seasons between 1911-1914 and returned for the 1920 season before retiring. 
He scored 7 tries and 18 goals during his career. 

He played halfback in the Glebe team that were defeated in the 1911 Final. 

Thiering was also a very successful middle-weight boxer in Sydney during his playing career.

Thiering died on 3 February 1960, at Kingsford, New South Wales.

References

Glebe rugby league players
1892 births
1968 deaths
Australian rugby league players
Australian people of German descent
Place of birth missing
Rugby league players from Sydney
Rugby league five-eighths
Rugby league halfbacks
Rugby league centres